Matthew Peet (born 15 April 1984) is an English professional rugby league coach who is the head coach of the Wigan Warriors in the Betfred Super League.

Background
Peet was born in Wigan and played amateur rugby league for many years around the area.  While studying English at The University of Manchester, from which he graduated in 2005, he began to focus on coaching, before later coaching senior sides at both Westhoughton and Wigan St Patricks.

Career
Peet joined Wigan in 2008, originally as a Scholarship coach.  Peet held a number of roles within the club's youth ranks before being appointed to his first full-time position as the club's performance coach. In 2013, he became Head Of Youth Performance, a role he would hold until 2018.  Wigan's youth sides would win their respective Grand Finals six out of the seven years he was in the role. During this time he also held the dual role of England RL Academy assistant coach from 2013-2016.

In 2018, he switched codes to rugby union, joining Sale Sharks as High Performance Manager, before returning to Wigan a year later as Assistant Coach to then-Head Coach, Adrian Lam.

On 5 October 2021, following the departure of Lam, Peet was promoted  head coach. On 28 May 2022, Peet coached Wigan to victory in the 2022 Challenge Cup Final over Huddersfield.  Peet guided Wigan to second place on the table at the end of the 2022 regular season.  Wigan would not reach the grand final however, losing 20-8 against Leeds in the semi-final.  In September 2022, Peet was awarded Super League Coach of the Year at the 2022 Super League Awards.

References

External links

Wigan Warriors profile

Wigan Warriors coaches
English rugby league coaches
1984 births
Living people